North Fall Creek Township is one of twelve townships in Yadkin County, North Carolina, United States. The township had a population of 1,433 according to the 2000 census.

Geographically, North Fall Creek Township occupies  in northern Yadkin County.  North Fall Creek Township's northern border is the Yadkin River.

Townships in Yadkin County, North Carolina
Townships in North Carolina